An Uç Bey or Uch Bey was the title given to semi-autonomous warrior chieftains during the Sultanate of Rum and the Rise of the Ottoman Empire. As leaders of akinji warrior bands, they played a leading role during the conquests of the Byzantine Empire and the other Christian states of the Balkans.

The term is analogous to Persian marzban or Western European margrave. Uç Beys were proclaimed ghazis and as a rule were dervishes. After Michael VIII Palaiologos removed the akritai and the land grants through which they survived, many Byzantine renegades went over to Ottoman service

Rumelia's first Uç Bey was Lala Şahin Pasha, who conquered Edirne, Boruj, Plovdiv, and was later the beylerbey of the Rumelia Eyalet. Pasha Yiğit Bey was an Uç Bey from Skopje to the Serbian and Greek lands, advancing to Bosnia and the Morea.

See also
 Osman's Dream
 Ghaza thesis

References 

Ottoman titles
Military history of the Ottoman Empire
14th century in the Ottoman Empire
15th century in the Ottoman Empire